Reeve's Bonebed is a geological formation in Presidio County, Texas, with the coordinates of 29.9° N, 104.2° W. It consists of fossiliferous sedimentary rock dating from the late Eocene and early Oligocene. It is well known for its vertebrate fossils, hence the name "bone bed". A few invertebrate fossils are also present.

Geology
Reeve's bonebed lies in the Vieja Formation.

Ecology
The University of Texas has a large collection of fossils from Reeve's Bonebed which represent numerous different taxonomic groups. In the following table, the number of specimens of each taxon in the university collection from the bonebed is indicated in the abundance column:

Mammals

Other taxa
Additional fossils to which a genus cannot be assigned include:

gastropods (snails)
testudinata (turtles)
Pholidosteids (Placoderms, armored fish)

Oreodont braincasts

Reeve's Bonebed is known for the recovery of casts of the brain cavity (endocast) of oreodonts. When an animal dies and the soft tissues decay, sediments fill the orifices of the bones including the brain case inside the skull. If the bone subsequently falls apart, a cast of the inside of the skull may remain intact. Hundreds of brain casts, mainly from Bathygenys, were recovered from Reeve's Bonebed. These casts have been used to gauge the size of the brain of these animals, as well as the size of the various brain lobes. The physical arrangement of the brain can give clues about the life of the living animal, such as how important smell was to it, as used in CT scans of Tyrannosaurus. Studies involving more than 150 of these endocasts have been performed from the Reeve's Bonebed samples.

References

Geologic formations of Texas